Charles Grignion the Younger (1754–1804) was a British history and portrait painter and engraver.

Biography
Grignion was born in London. His uncle was the prolific engraver Charles Grignion the Elder.

He died in Livorno after a short illness and was buried there in the Old English Cemetery

References

External links 
 

18th-century British painters
British male painters
1754 births
1804 deaths
Painters from London
18th-century English people
18th-century engravers